Nefteyugansk Airport  is an airport in Khanty–Mansi Autonomous Okrug, Russia located  northeast of Nefteyugansk. Serving central Siberia, it features a long asphalt runway, and serviced airline traffic until it was closed in 2005.

Defunct airports
Airports built in the Soviet Union
Airports in Khanty-Mansi Autonomous Okrug